Facing the Sea (Spanish:Rostro al mar) is a 1951 Spanish drama film directed by Carlos Serrano de Osma. It deals with the return of exiles from the Spanish Civil War era.

Synopsis 
After the Spanish Civil War, Alberto and Isabel decide to flee to France to avoid reprisals. She is pregnant and on the way, she goes into labor, so they decide to stop before they reach the border. Alberto decides to leave so as not to endanger his family, promising Isabel to meet again as soon as possible.

Cast
 Antonio Bofarull as Manuel  
 José Bruguera as Vicente  
 Fortunato García as Andrés  
 Montserrat Garcia as Martita  
 Camino Garrigó as Doña marta  
 José Gayán as Frankie  
 Francisco Melgares as Marcos  
 Eulalia Montero as Isabel  
 José Manuel Pinillos as Ferruchi  
 Antonio Piñeiro as Oficial  
 José Luis Quintana as Ginés 
 Illa Serti as María  
 Juan Manuel Soriano as Ramón  
 Carlo Tamberlani as Alberto  
 Guillermo Urtazun 
 Lily Vincenti as Catherine

References

Bibliography 
 Bentley, Bernard. A Companion to Spanish Cinema. Boydell & Brewer 2008.

External links 
 

1951 drama films
Spanish drama films
1951 films
1950s Spanish-language films
Films directed by Carlos Serrano de Osma
Spanish black-and-white films
1950s Spanish films